Broderick Dyke (born 31 December 1960) is a former professional tennis player from Australia.

Dyke enjoyed most of his tennis success while playing doubles. During his career he won 8 doubles titles and finished runner-up an additional 14 times. He achieved a career-high doubles ranking of world No. 23 in March 1984. In singles he was twice a runner-up, including at the Brussels Indoor where he defeated Boris Becker and Miloslav Mečíř en route to the final.

Career finals

Doubles (8 titles, 14 runner-ups)

Singles (2 runner-ups)

References

External links
 
 

Australian expatriate sportspeople in the United States
Australian male tennis players
Tennis people from South Australia
Wichita State Shockers men's tennis players
Australian people of Dutch descent
Living people
1960 births
People from Gumeracha, South Australia